Erddig Hall (or simply Erddig) is a Grade-I listed National Trust property in Wrexham, Wales.

Erddig has been described as 'the most evocative Upstairs Downstairs house in Britain' due to the well-rounded view it presents of the lifestyles of all of its occupants, both family and staff. The eccentric Yorke family had an unusual relationship with their staff and celebrated their servants in a large and unique collection of portraits and poems. This collection, coupled with well-preserved servants' rooms and an authentic laundry, bakehouse, sawmill, and smithy, provide an insight into how 18th to 20th century servants lived.

The state rooms contain fine furniture, textiles and wallpapers and the fully restored walled garden is one of the most important surviving 18th century gardens in Britain.

History

The first recorded reference to Wrexham was in 1161 to a castle at 'Wristlesham'. This castle was probably constructed in what is now the grounds of Erddig. The remains of a Norman motte and bailey, constructed around 1090, can be found in the park of the later mansion. The fortress was built on a steep-sided promontory and the ramparts were adapted from a prehistoric hillfort and incorporate a section of Wat's Dyke.

The original house was built on a dramatic escarpment above the winding Clywedog river between 1684–1689 to the designs of Thomas Webb for Joshua Edisbury of Pentre Clawdd, High Sheriff of Denbighshire. Joshua Edisbury was forced to borrow large sums to fund the project which resulted in his bankruptcy and, in 1716, he was forced to sell Erddig. John Meller, Master of the Chancery, bought the mortgage on Erddig from Sir John Trevor.

John Meller refurbished and enlarged the house (including adding two wings in the 1720s). A staunch supporter of the royal House of Hanover, he treated his neighbours with suspicion in what was a strongly Jacobite locality. On his death in 1733, unmarried and childless, he passed it to his nephew, Simon Yorke ( 1767) (first cousin of Philip Yorke, 1st Earl of Hardwicke) thereby establishing an unbroken line of ownership to last for almost 250 years.

In 1771, Philip Yorke I began a programme of alterations to the main house including the facing the west front with stone and moving the bedrooms from the ground floor to the first floor. He was the author of the Royal Tribes of Wales and there is a room in Erddig which features the coats of arms of the chief North Wales families.

General John Yorke (1814–1890) was to become from 1861, the owner of the distinctive Plas Newydd in Llangollen, the self-styled home of the famous Ladies of Llangollen.

The estate began to decline following the death of Philp Yorke II in 1922 as income diminished and staff were laid off. The house began to decay under his successor, Simon Yorke IV, who became reclusive and failed to install electricity, running water, gas or a phone. Whilst causing damage to the property, this period of neglect ensured that Erddig remained remarkably unaltered.

In March 1973, the last squire Philip Scott Yorke, a bachelor, gave Erddig to the National Trust. It was strengthened using the compensation of £120,000 the National Trust was able to extract from the National Coal Board.  of Erddig Park (out of view of the house) was subsequently sold for £995,000 and this paid for the restoration work on the house. The restoration was completed on 27 June 1977 when Charles, Prince of Wales officially opened Erddig to the public, joking that it was the first time in his, albeit short, life that he had opened something that was already 300 years old.

List of Yorke Squires 
Simon Yorke I (1696-1767), cousin of Philip Yorke, 1st Earl Of Hardwicke, maternal nephew of John Mellor, married Dorothy Hutton (d1787)
Philip Yorke I (1743-1804), son of Simon Yorke I and his wife Dorothy Hutton, married Elizabeth Cust (1750-1779) and later Diana Wynne (d1805)
Simon Yorke II (1771-1834), son of Philip Yorke I and his first wife Elizabeth Cust, married Margaret Holland (1778-1848)
Simon Yorke III (1811-1894), son of Simon Yorke II and his wife Margaret Holland, married Victoria Cust (1824-1895)
Philip Yorke II (1849-1922), son of Simon Yorke III and his wife Victoria Cust, married Annette Fountayne (d1899), and later Louisa Matilda Scott (1863-1951)
Simon Yorke IV (1903-1966), son of Philip Yorke II and his second wife Louisa Matilda Scott, died unmarried
Philip Yorke III (1905-1978), brother of Simon Yorke IV. died unmarried

Many of the Yorke family have memorials in the church of Saint Deiniol at Marchwiel.

One of the main streets of Wrexham city Centre, Yorke Street, is named after the family and the Squire Yorke public house in the city is named after Philip Yorke III.

Tour of the mansion house

A tour of the house, which starts "below stairs", tells of the Yorke family's unusually high regard for their servants and, through a collection of portraits, photographs and verses (a family tradition started by Simon's son Philip Yorke (1743–1804), provides a record of the people who lived and worked on the estate. In the staterooms "above stairs" there is a fine collection of 18th century furniture and other treasures (many of which originally belonged to John Meller, including a portrait in the Music Room of Judge Jeffreys, the "Hanging Judge").

The Yorke family seemingly never threw anything away and the house now has a unique collection ranging from the rare and magnificent (including some Chinese wallpaper in the State Bedroom) to the ordinary and everyday: one of the conditions that the last Squire, Philip S. Yorke (1905–1978) imposed on handing over the house and estate to the National Trust in 1973 was that nothing was to be removed from the house. He is quoted as saying: "My only interest for many years has been that this unique establishment for which my family have foregone many luxuries and comforts over seven generations should now be dedicated to the enjoyment of all those who may come here and see a part of our national heritage preserved for all foreseeable time."

Gardens

Erddig's walled garden is one of the most important surviving 18th century formal gardens in Britain. They contain rare fruit trees, a canal, a pond, and a Victorian parterre. Around a hundred cultivars of Hedera (ivy) are accredited with Plant Heritage as a National Plant Collection.

There is also a fine example of gates and railings made by ironsmiths the Davies brothers, of nearby Bersham, for Stansty Park; the gates were moved to Erddig in 1908. The arrangement of alcoves in the yew hedges in the formal gardens may be a form of bee bole.

The 486-hectare (1,200-acre) landscape pleasure park was designed by William Emes.

Emes' landscaping work involved the removal of a section of Wat's Dyke near the house. In 2018 this was excavated by the Clwyd-Powys Archaeological Trust who found that most of the ditch and some of the bank of this linear earthwork survived intact.

The parks and gardens are listed as Grade I in the Cadw/ICOMOS Register of Parks and Gardens of Special Historic Interest in Wales.

Estate buildings
The estate buildings include the joiners' shop and smithy, the Midden Yard (with its saw mill and cart sheds), and the Stable Yard (with its stables and tack room, carriages and vintage bicycles and vintage cars). In the house are the laundry, bakehouse, kitchen and scullery.

The nearby river supplied a source of water, which was pumped uphill by a hydraulic ram, the water entering the ram via a feature known as Erddig's Cup and Saucer.

Whilst occupied by the Yorke family the house was never installed with mains electricity, with the last Squire, Philip, relying on a portable generator to power his single television set. The saw mill, however, was equipped with its own static steam engine to provide the power for sawing and turning.

Awards 
In 2003, Erddig was voted by readers of the Radio Times and viewers of the Channel 5 television series Britain's Finest Stately Homes as "Britain's second finest".  In September 2007 it was voted the UK's "favourite Historic House" and the "8th most popular historic site" in the UK by Britain's Best.

See also
List of gardens in Wales

Bibliography

References

External links

National Trust Erddig page
Wikidata List of paintings on view at Erddig
BBC Erddig page
BBC Erddig slideshow
Archives Network Wales info on Erddig
The Yorke family of Erddig

Buildings and structures in Wrexham County Borough
Country houses in Wales
Gardens in Wales
Grade I listed buildings in Wrexham County Borough
Historic house museums in Wales
Museums in Wrexham County Borough
National Trust properties in Wales
Wrexham
Registered historic parks and gardens in Wrexham County Borough